The Manantial Espejo mine is a large silver mine located in Deseado Massif in Santa Cruz Province, southern Patagonia. Manantial Espejo represents one of the largest silver reserve in Argentina and in the world having estimated reserves of 25.7 million oz of silver.

See also 
Mining in Argentina

References 

Silver mines in Argentina
Mines in Santa Cruz Province, Argentina